The Extremadura Open was a golf tournament on the European Tour in 1994. It was held at Golf del Guadiana in Badajoz, Spain. It was won by England's Paul Eales.

Winners

External links
Coverage on the European Tour's official site

Former European Tour events
Golf tournaments in Spain